Ein Mensch, ein Ding, ein Traum is the first album of the German band Stillste Stund.

Track listing
"Furchtbare Herrin (Prolog)"– 2:28
"Der Untergang"– 5:39
"Desolation"– 5:37
"Kains Kinder"– 5:16
"Tausende von Welten"– 5:52
"Drei sind Eins"– 4:26
"Elfentanz"– 5:37
"Dornen"– 5:03
"Eleonores Auge"– 6:50
"Von der Tiefe"– 5:07
"Vereint"– 6:44
"IV"– 2:17
"Das Ende aller Sehnsüchte"– 7:16
"Heimweg (Epilog)"– 2:02

Info
 Tracks 2, 3, 4, 5, 7, 8, 9, 10, 13 and 14 written and produced by Oliver Uckermann
 Lyrics on track 1, "Furchtbare Herrin (Prolog)" by Friedrich Nietzsche
 Lyrics on tracks 6 and 12 by Hugo von Hofmannsthal
 Lyrics on track 11, "Vereint" by R. Kraft
 Male vocals by Oliver Uckermann
 Female vocals on "Elfentanz," and "Von der Tiefe," by Birgit Strunz
 Female vocals on tracks 2, 6 and 12 by Birgit Strunz and Inanis Kurzweil

Notes
 The cover artwork for this album was inspired by the famous painting "Midsummer Eve" by Edward Robert Hughes.

References

External links
 Ein Mensch, ein Ding, ein Traum at Musicbrainz.org
 Discographie at official website
 Stillste Stund Discography Info

2000 albums
Alice In... albums
Stillste Stund albums